The St Andrews Botanic Garden is an 18-acre botanical garden in the university town of St Andrews in Fife, Scotland. It is located on the banks of the wooded Kinness Burn in the Canongate area, on the southern edge of the town. The gardens are supported by the University of St Andrews and Fife Council, and by admission charges. The garden is included on the Inventory of Gardens and Designed Landscapes in Scotland.

Collections
It contains more than 8000 species of native and exotic plants. These are laid out in zones of woodland, meadow, shrubbery, herbaceous bedding, sand dunes, a large rockery and a series of ponds. There are also vegetable and herb gardens, and two large greenhouses.

There are borders that specialise in Chinese and Chilean flora, containing both woody and herbaceous specimens.to recreate the full environment of those parts of the world.

There are significant collections of Cotoneaster, Berberis and Sorbus.

The gardens also house an algal herbarium based on the collection of seaweed specimens gathered originally by the phycologist Margaret Gatty (1809-1873)  and enlarged since her death.

History 
The gardens were founded by the University of St Andrews in 1889 on a different site within the grounds of St Mary's College. The principal founder was the botanist Dr John Hardie Wilson. The early site consisted of 78 similar beds laid out according to the Bentham and Hooker system of plant classification. The new site was laid out to a design meant to mitigate the Scottish climate with a dense barrier of pine trees along the western edge, and many shrubs and understory trees around the site to give additional shelter.

Gallery

References

External links 

St Andrews
Botanical gardens in Scotland
Inventory of Gardens and Designed Landscapes